The Alpaero Sirius, also called the Noin Sirius, is a French high-wing, strut-braced, pod-and-boom, cruciform tail, single-seat motor glider that was designed by Claude Noin and produced by his company, Alpaero of Châteauvieux, Hautes-Alpes. It was available as plans for amateur construction and also as a kit, but has been discontinued.

Design and development
Named for the star, the prototype Sirius was made from wood, tube and aircraft fabric and first flew in August 1984. The prototype had an  wingspan.

The production Sirius fuselage is predominantly made from fibreglass, with wooden bulkheads. The  span tapered wing has a wooden spar and Styrofoam wing ribs reinforced with fibreglass and features air brakes on the top surface for glidepath control. The wing's leading edge is fabricated from  hot-wire cut foam, laminated with fibreglass. The wing and rudder are fabric covered. The fixed landing gear is a centre-line bicycle gear, with auxiliary wing tip and tail wheels. The main wheel has a drum brake. The  König SC 430 engine, or alternatively the  JPX D-320 engine, is mounted behind the cockpit and beneath the tail boom in pusher configuration and features a propeller guard plate just behind the main wheel. The propeller is a fixed pitch two-bladed design with small diameter.

In 1998 the design was available as plans for US$220 or as a kit for US$7900. Building time from the kit was estimated as 700 hours.

Variants
Sirius-C
Model for the European microlight category.

Specifications (Sirius)

See also

References

External links

1980s French sailplanes
Homebuilt aircraft
Motor gliders
Aircraft first flown in 1984